INS Sumedha (P58) is the third Saryu class patrol vessel of the Indian Navy, designed and constructed indigenously by the Goa Shipyard Limited.  It is designed to undertake fleet support operations, coastal and offshore patrolling, ocean surveillance and monitoring of sea lines of communications and offshore assets and escort duties.

Construction
The Naval Offshore Patrol Vessel INS Sumedha was launched at Goa Shipyard on 21 May 2011, and was handed over to the Indian Navy on 11 March 2014.

Gallery

See also

References

External links

Patrol vessels of the Indian Navy
2011 ships
Ships built in India